Laurent Montaron (born 1972 in Verneuil-sur-Avre), is a French visual artist.

Work 
Laurent Montaron is an interdisciplinary artist working across film, photography, installation, sound and objects. His work  is suffused with the contemporary history of the media and question the tools that shape our representations ,. By revealing the sometimes irrational element of belief involved with emerging techniques; his works remind us that while technology has provided us with new means of perceiving and representing reality it has not necessarily brought us closer from the truth for it has also given rise to new ways for questioning paradoxes attendant on our awareness of modernity.

Exhibitions

Solo exhibitions 

ecce, BIASA ArtSpace Ubud, 2019
Everything is Accidental, Mercer Union, Toronto, 2014
 Prospectif Cinema: Laurent Montaron, Centre Pompidou, Paris, 2013
 Laurent Montaron, Pigna Project Space, Rome, 2013
 Laurent Montaron, galerie schleicher+lange, Berlin 2012
 Pace, Kunsthaus Baselland, Basel, 2010

Group exhibitions 
 You imagine what you desire, 19th Biennale of Sydney, 2014
 The Encyclopedic Palace, 55th Venice Biennale, 2013
 Open End- Goetz Collection, Haus der Kunst, Munich, 2012
 Lost in LA, Los Angeles Municipal Art Gallery, Los Angeles, 2012

References  

1972 births
French artists
Living people